Sea Gate is a private gated community at the far western end of Coney Island at the southwestern tip of the New York City borough of Brooklyn. Located on the portion of the Coney Island peninsula west of West 37th Street, it contains mostly single-family homes, some directly on Gravesend Bay.

History
The area that is now Sea Gate was once known as Norton's Point. "Norton" was the name of the owner of a casino, which was situated where the Coney Island Light now stands. The neighborhood held a reputation for gambling before it was developed into a residential neighborhood.

Sea Gate was developed into a full neighborhood in 1892 by developer Alrick Man. By 1899, Sea Gate property owners included the Morgan, Dodge, and Vanderbilt families. Governor Al Smith and others frequented the Atlantic Yacht Club, whose clubhouse was designed by Stanford White. Sea Gate is surrounded on three sides by water with private beaches. In 1995, the Army Corps of Engineers completed its work of replenishing Coney beaches and building new jetties, including a long jetty at the border of Sea Gate and Coney Island.

In October 2012, Hurricane Sandy devastated the neighborhood, which was inundated by ocean water and battered by strong winds. The area sustained significant damage and numerous houses were destroyed. The "Lindy Park" sea wall/bulkhead (officially known as Beach Reservation extending from Beach 48th Street to Beach 50th Street) was destroyed leaving Sea Gate, Coney Island and beyond open to any rough seas and additional damage.

Description
Sea Gate is a gated community on the Coney Island peninsula west of West 37th Street. Residents refer to Sea Gate as "the gate" and venturing into adjoining Coney Island as going "out the gate". There are no stores in the neighborhood. There are express buses to Manhattan, which take an average of 80 minutes. Sea Gate is made up of 850 single-family houses in a variety of architectural styles, including Queen Anne Style and Mediterranean.

Residents pay for private security (Sea Gate Public Safety Department) as well as sewer, beach, lifeguards, street lights, and street cleaning.

There are two points of interest in Sea Gate. Located on Beach 47th Street in Sea Gate is the  Coney Island Light, is a lighthouse built in 1890, before the area was populated. The lighthouse is the former home of Frank Schubert, the United States' last civilian lighthouse keeper, who died in 2003. The chapel in Sea Gate, once used for services and built in 1901, is a historical building now used for social events, yoga classes, and is a polling site at election times. The Chapel with its stained-glass windows is the first structure seen when entering the main security gate.

In addition to large and private beach areas, Sea Gate has two parks:
 A playground with a basketball court and children's jungle gym pieces next to the Sea Gate Community Center on Surf Avenue.
 Beach Reservation (as referred to on the map of Sea Gate, VI.a, 1894) is near the Coney Island Light and extends before and beyond Norton's Point. A sandy/grassy patch of land with views of Lower New York Harbor and the Verrazano-Narrows Bridge. It is nicknamed "Lindy Park", commemorating Charles Lindbergh.

Controversy
There have been some controversial cases involving SGPD.

In 2013, Christopher Simmons, a Black officer with the Sea Gate Public Safety Department  filed a federal discrimination and retaliation lawsuit alleging that the Sea Gate Association's president called him a "schwartze" (a Yiddish racial slur for "black") and that he was passed over for promotion, demoted, and then fired. In 2020, residents of Sea Gate called for the head of the Sea Gate Public Safety Department to resign amid accusations of racism and nepotism. Residents also filed a lawsuit against the Sea Gate Homeowners Association, alleging non-white residents were harassed for not providing IDs, vehicles were followed outside of the boundaries of the gates, and that discrimination occurred against black members of the Public Safety force.

Another incident, in 2020, involved an off-duty NYPD officer being contacted by a SGPD officer (despite not being in Sea Gate) and questioned, with the SGPD allegedly drawing his firearm twice. The NYPD (now retired) officer, took legal action.

Demographics
Sea Gate is largely populated by families living in single- and two-family houses, 54 percent being rentals. As of 2000, the median age was 38.6 years and the median household income was $41,659. In addition to city and state taxes, residents also pay dues and charges to the Sea Gate Association, which have averaged $3,000 per year.

In 1960, Sea Gate was 99 percent white, and by the 2010 census, Sea Gate was 83 percent white. The community became majority Jewish by the 1930s; prior to the 1930s, there were signs in the community reading "no dogs or Jews". Many Hasidic Jews and Russians have settled in Sea Gate, along with a small number of middle-class Black families. Tensions around race and class exist between Sea Gate and the rest of Coney Island which has a significantly larger Black and Latino population. Both Sea Gate homeowners association and their public safety department have been frequently accused of racism and have been the subject of multiple federal lawsuits.

Notable residents

 Chaim Zanvl Abramowitz (1902–1995), "the Ribnitzer Rebbe"
 Austin Basis (born 1976), actor
 Mordechai Ben David and his son, Yeedle, singers
 Jeffrey Epstein (1953–2019), Wall Street financier and convicted sex offender
 Leonard Everett Fisher (born 1924), writer (The Jetty Chronicles)
 Jack Foley (1891–1967), inventor of movie sound effects techniques
 Yossi Green (born 1955), Jewish music composer
 Moss Hart (1904–1961), playwright and theatre director
 Ludwig Satz (1891–1944), Yiddish theater and film actor
 Andrea Batista Schlesinger (born 1976), political writer and campaigner who was executive director of the Drum Major Institute
 Frank Schubert (1915–2003), last civilian lighthouse keeper in the United States
 Sandra Seacat (born 1936), actress/acting teacher and coach (lived there as Sandra Kaufman, her then-married name, for most of the 1960s)
 Harriet Shorr (1939–2016), artist, writer, poet and professor who was known for large-scale realistic still life paintings.
 Beverly Sills (1929–2007), opera singer
 Isaac Bashevis Singer (1902—1991), Yiddish author
 Ernst Steiger (1832–1917), bookseller, publisher and bibliographer.
 Jake Steinfeld (born 1958), actor, fitness specialist and fitness trainer

References

External links

Geography of Brooklyn
Gated communities in New York (state)
Hasidic Judaism in New York City
Historic Jewish communities in the United States
Jews and Judaism in Brooklyn
Populated coastal places in New York (state)
Russian-Jewish culture in New York City